Little Miss Lake Panasoffkee, or Little Miss Panasoffkee, is the name given to an unidentified young woman found murdered on February 19, 1971, in Lake Panasoffkee, Florida, United States. She has remained unidentified for 51 years.

The murder remains unsolved despite the forensic reconstruction of the victim's face in 1971 and 2012. The case was featured on the television show Unsolved Mysteries in an episode that premiered on October 14, 1992.

Discovery of the body
On February 19, 1971, two teenage hitchhikers discovered a partially submerged figure floating beneath a highway overpass in Lake Panasoffkee, Florida.

The body was dressed in a green shirt, green plaid pants, and a green floral poncho. Also found were a white gold watch and a gold necklace. On her ring finger there was a gold ring with a transparent stone, indicating that she may have been married.

A forensic examination of the remains was conducted by Dr. William Schutze. Schutze concluded that the victim had been killed approximately 30 days before her body was discovered. A man's size-36 belt was fastened around her neck, strongly indicating strangulation as the cause of death.

Forensic examination
The body was exhumed in February 1986 for further forensic examination.

The woman was determined to have been between 17 and 24 years old when she died, weighing about 115 pounds. She had brown hair and prominent cheekbones. She was between 5 feet, 2 inches and 5 feet, 5 inches in height. She had received extensive dental work, including numerous silver tooth fillings. She had a porcelain crown on one of her upper right teeth.

It was determined that she had borne at least two children before her death. One of her ribs had been fractured at the time of death, leading investigators to theorize that the killer had possibly knelt on her while he strangled her with the belt.

Investigators initially believed the woman to be either of European or Native American ancestry. A further exhumation and examination of the remains, conducted in 2012, established that she was of European descent. An examination of Harris lines in the victim's bones indicated that an illness or malnutrition had briefly arrested her growth in childhood.

Examining the lead isotopes in the victim's teeth, a geological scientist deduced that the victim had undoubtedly spent her childhood and adolescence in southern Europe close to the sea—most likely south of the Greek city of Athens—until within a year of her murder. The geological scientist George Kamenov pinpointed the most likely place as the fishing port of Laurium, Greece.

Forensic examination of her hair supported the theory that she had been visiting temporarily. This was indicated by the fact that she had been in Florida for less than two months before her death.

An orthopedic surgery procedure, known as the "Watson-Jones" technique, had been performed on her right ankle when she was about 16 years old. This operation—which involved stretching the tendon by screws drilled into the bone—would most likely have been performed to rectify a chronic instability which would likely have seen the victim sprain her ankle several times before the operation. Periostitis was found in her right leg, which may have been noticeably uncomfortable for the victim.

A further development with the case occurred when it was featured on a Greek crime show (Fos Sto Tounel). A woman came forward to say that she believed the facial reconstructions looked like a girl she knew, called Konstantina. She and Konstantina attended a prep school in Greece, where they were trained to be domestic help. After finishing the course, the school sent their students abroad to Australia or America as part of a two-year work contract. The school was funded by the International Organization for Migration. This woman had lost contact with Konstantina when they were separated, Konstantina was sent to America and the woman was sent to Australia. Konstantina had arrived in America at exactly the same time as the forensic testing indicated the victim had.

Facial reconstructions
A collection of forensic facial reconstructions were made in the 1980s to show what Little Miss Lake Panasoffkee may have looked like at stages of her life. In 2012, another composite was created, visually different from the first. The composite was combined with a scale model of the victim's clothing.

See also
 List of murdered American children
 List of unsolved murders

References

Cited works and further reading

External links

 
 
 
 

20th-century births
1971 deaths
1971 in Florida
1971 murders in the United States
Deaths by person in Florida
Deaths by strangulation in the United States
Female murder victims
Greek people murdered abroad
History of women in Florida
Incidents of violence against women
Murdered American children
People from Sumter County, Florida
People murdered in Florida
Unidentified American children
Unidentified murder victims in Florida
Unsolved murders in the United States
Violence against women in the United States